Kim Il-soon (Hangul:김일순; born January 24, 1969) is a retired female tennis player from South Korea, who twice represented her native country at the Summer Olympics: in 1988 and 1992.

ITF finals

Singles (6–4)

Doubles (21–2)

External links
 
 
 
 

1969 births
Living people
South Korean female tennis players
Tennis players at the 1988 Summer Olympics
Tennis players at the 1992 Summer Olympics
Olympic tennis players of South Korea
Place of birth missing (living people)
Asian Games medalists in tennis
Tennis players at the 1986 Asian Games
Tennis players at the 1990 Asian Games
Medalists at the 1986 Asian Games
Medalists at the 1990 Asian Games
Asian Games bronze medalists for South Korea
Asian Games silver medalists for South Korea
Universiade medalists in tennis
Universiade silver medalists for South Korea
Universiade bronze medalists for South Korea
20th-century South Korean women